This is an incomplete list of supermarket chains in Poland. For supermarkets worldwide see List of supermarkets.

Major retail chains

Hypermarkets

Delicatessen stores

Cash & carry wholesalers

Specialty chains

Consumer electronics

Culture and Multimedia

Furniture

Hardware store chains

Pharmacy

Fashion

See also 
List of restaurant chains in Poland

References 

 
Poland
Supermarkets